Mireles is a Spanish surname. In the United States, the surname is most commonly found in South Texas and New Mexico. Notable people with the surname include:

Alberto Miguel Martínez Mireles (born 1950), Mexican politician
Christopher Mireles (born 1992), Mexican BMX rider
Edmundo Mireles Jr. (born 1953), American FBI agent
 (born 1939), Mexican politician
John Mireles (born 1964), American photographer
Matt Mireles (born 1980), American technology entrepreneur
Sylvester Raymond Mireles (born 1929), American civil rights activist and college professor
Víctor Manuel Vázquez Mireles (born 1967), Mexican drug lord 
 Laura G Mireles Navarro (born 1966), Mexican Author (as Laura G Munoz) and Reverend from Assemblies of God